The 1997 Amsterdam Admirals season was the third season for the franchise in the World League of American Football (WLAF). The team was led by head coach Al Luginbill in his third year, and played its home games at Amsterdam ArenA in Amsterdam, Netherlands. They finished the regular season in fourth place with a record of five wins and five losses.

Offseason

World League draft

Personnel

Staff

Roster

Schedule

Standings

Game summaries

Week 1: vs Scottish Claymores

Week 2: at Frankfurt Galaxy

Week 3: vs London Monarchs

Week 4: vs Rhein Fire

Week 5: at Barcelona Dragons

Week 6: at Scottish Claymores

Week 7: vs Barcelona Dragons

Week 8: at London Monarchs

Week 9: at Rhein Fire

Week 10: vs Frankfurt Galaxy

Awards
After the completion of the regular season, the All-World League team was selected by members of the media. Amsterdam had only one player selected, defensive tackle Troy Ridgley.

Notes

References

Amsterdam Admirals seasons